The Lithuanian Women's Handball League, is the top-tier team handball competition in the Republic of Lithuania.

Champions

Winners by season

References

External links
 Official website
 Lithuanian Handball Federation

 
Women's handball leagues
1992 establishments in Lithuania